The Last of the Blue Devils is an album by jazz pianist Jay McShann recorded in 1977 and released by the Atlantic label.

Reception

The Allmusic review by Rick Anderson noted "McShann had much more to offer the world than his role as caregiver to the inventor of bebop. Leading an all-star cast ... McShann teaches an entire course on the history of blues-based jazz ... Highly recommended".

Track listing
 "Confessin' the Blues" (Jay McShann, Walter Brown) – 4:43
 "'Tain't Nobody's Bizness If I Do" (Everett Robbins, Porter Grainger) – 6:59
 "Hootie Blues" (Charlie Parker, McShann, Brown) – 4:29
 "Blue Devil Jump" (Paul Quinichette) – 3:25
 "My Chile" (McShann) – 4:15
 "Jumpin' at the Woodside" (Count Basie, John Hendricks) – 4:36
 "Just for You" (Pete Johnson, Herman Walder, Leo Corday, Booker Washington) – 5:37
 "Hot Biscuits" (McShann) – 3:25
 "'Fore Day Rider" (McShann, Brown) – 4:08
 "Kansas City" (Jerry Leiber, Mike Stoller) – 4:51

Personnel
Jay McShann – piano, electric piano, vocals
Joe Newman – trumpet (tracks 1–6 & 8–10)
Paul Quinichette, Buddy Tate –  tenor saxophone (tracks 1–6 & 8–10)
John Scofield – electric guitar (tracks 1–6 & 8–10)
Milt Hinton – bass (tracks 1–6 & 8–10)
Jackie Williams – drums (tracks 1–6 & 8–10)

References

1978 albums
Jay McShann albums
Atlantic Records albums